Gerald Home (18 October 1950 – 6 October 2021) was a British actor best known for playing Tessek-Squid Head and the Mon Calamari Officer Captain Verrack in Return of the Jedi.

Early life
Home was born in Belfast, Northern Ireland, on 18 October 1950, and emigrated to Australia with his family when he was 16. He finished his education in Australia, and spent three years there as an actor and teacher, before returning to the United Kingdom to train at The Drama Studio London, and graduated in July 1977.

Career
Home filmed minor roles in Return of the Jedi, and worked as a puppeteer on Little Shop of Horrors, operating Audrey II the flesh-eating plant. Other film work includes London Boulevard and Hideo Nakata's Chatroom.

His television appearances include: Casualty, The Boot Street Band, Spitting Image, Situation Critical, Jenny's War, Keeping Mum, Harry's Mad, Time Gentlemen Please, Pay & Display, Paul Dreams of Bette, The Scarlet and the Black and Shane.

He was the original Mr. Muscle in a series of Mr. Muscle television commercials.

In the West End of London he appeared in stage productions No Sex Please, We're British at the Strand Theatre, in The Arabian Nights at the Arts Theatre and in The Blue Angel with the Royal Shakespeare Company at the Gielgud Theatre. He was in ten plays at the Polka Theatre in Wimbledon, London, where he lived.

Death
Home died from liver cancer on 6 October 2021, at the age of 70.

Filmography

Film

Television

References

External links
Gerald Home official website

Gerald Home Interview Star Wars Turkey
Gerald Home Interview Starwarsy
Maarten Bouw Interview with Gerald Home

1950 births
2021 deaths
Alumni of the Drama Studio London
Male film actors from Northern Ireland
Male stage actors from Northern Ireland
Male television actors from Northern Ireland
Male actors from Belfast
20th-century male actors from Northern Ireland
21st-century male actors from Northern Ireland
British puppeteers
Deaths from liver cancer